Waymond Bryant (born July 28, 1952) is a former American football linebacker. He played professionally in the National Football League (NFL) for the Chicago Bears.

Biography
Bryant was born in Dallas, Texas and attended Franklin D. Roosevelt High School in Dallas. He played college football at Tennessee State University. He was selected by the Associated Press as a first-team linebacker on the 1972 Little All-America college football team.

Bryant was drafted in the first round of the 1974 NFL Draft by the Chicago Bears. He played four seasons in the National Football League.
Near the end of an October 10, 1977, game verse the Los Angeles Rams, Bryant hit quarterback Joe Namath.  Namath did not return to the game and never played professional football again.

References

External links 
 Pro-Football-Reference.Com
 databaseFootball.com

1952 births
Living people
American football linebackers
Chicago Bears players
Tennessee State Tigers football players
Franklin D. Roosevelt High School (Dallas) alumni